The UT Martin Skyhawks women's basketball team is the team that represents the University of Tennessee at Martin in Martin, Tennessee, United States. The school's team currently competes in the Ohio Valley Conference.

History
Since beginning play in 1969, the Skyhawks have an all-time record of 578-687, per the end of the 2015-16 season. They appeared in the inaugural AIAW women's basketball tournament in 1972, beating Long Beach State 53-43 in the First Round before losing to Mississippi University for Women state college 43-25. Since 1999, the Skyhawks have won the Ohio Valley Conference season title five times while also winning the tournament four times, two of them being both in the same year. They have also made three appearances in the WNIT (1999, 2015, 2016).

Postseason results

NCAA Division I

AIAW Division I
The Skyhawks made one appearance in the AIAW National Division I basketball tournament, with a combined record of 1–1.

References

External links